Lieutenant-Brigadier Juniti Saito (born April 12, 1942), count Saito, is a military officer and was the commander of the Brazilian Air Force from 2007 to 2015.

Born in the city of Pompeia, São Paulo, he is the son of Iwataro Saito and Toshike Tamaoki.

Flight information
Flight hours: more than 6,000
Aircraft flown: TF-33, F-80, Cessna T-37, VU-93, C-91 AVRO, C-95 (Bandeirante), AT-26 (Xavante), F-5E/F (Tiger II) e F-103E (Mirage III)

Promotions

Awards and decorations
 Grand Cross of the Order of Aeronautical Merit
 Grand Officer of the Order of Naval Merit
 Grand Officer of the Order of Military Merit
 Grand Officer of the Order of Merit for Defence
 High Distinction of the Order of Military Judicial Merit
 Medal of the Farroupilha Merit
 Negrinho do Pastoreio Medal
 Medal of Inconfidence
 Medal of Military Sports Merit
 Grand Cordon of the Order of the Rising Sun (2015)

References

1942 births
Living people
Brazilian people of Japanese descent
People from São Paulo (state)
Brazilian Air Force generals